Stoyan Nikolov Ivanov (born 2 April 1949) is a Bulgarian former wrestler who competed in the 1972 Summer Olympics, in the 1976 Summer Olympics, and in the 1980 Summer Olympics.

References

External links
 

1949 births
Living people
Olympic wrestlers of Bulgaria
Wrestlers at the 1972 Summer Olympics
Wrestlers at the 1976 Summer Olympics
Wrestlers at the 1980 Summer Olympics
Bulgarian male sport wrestlers
Olympic silver medalists for Bulgaria
Olympic medalists in wrestling
People from Zlatitsa
Medalists at the 1976 Summer Olympics
Sportspeople from Sofia Province
20th-century Bulgarian people
21st-century Bulgarian people